Carine Babina Ngombo (born 16 January 1994) is a Congolese handball player for Mikishi Lubumbashi and the DR Congo national team.

She competed at the 2015 World Women's Handball Championship in Denmark.

References

1994 births
Living people
Democratic Republic of the Congo female handball players
21st-century Democratic Republic of the Congo people